Munisport Landfill is a closed landfill located in North Miami, Florida adjacent to a low-income community, a regional campus of Florida International University, Oleta River State Park (a state recreational park), and estuarine Biscayne Bay.

The  Munisport landfill contains approximately 6.2 million cubic yards of municipal waste, and was in operation for seven years.

Munisport was found to contain contaminants, and a "small amount" of hospital biohazard waste was found on the site and drums of toxic chemicals during its operation. Audubon Society compiled a list of chemicals Munisport employees admitted had been buried in the dump. Environmental Protection Agency (EPA) officials never detected dangerous levels of those in the landfill and concentrated their efforts on the mangrove preserve south of the site, where the chief concern was the seepage of ammonia, created naturally as organic debris decomposes.

The 1992 Consent Decree between the City of North Miami and the United States redefined and shrank the National Priorities List boundaries of the site to a  site is in wetlands to the east, away from the actual dump.

In 2011, Munisport was designated by the EPA as a site ready for use and redevelopment.

Location: North Miami, Florida
Congressional District: 22

Current ownership
City of North Miami, Florida.

History

Current status
Brownfield.

Location
Munisport is bordered on the north by Northeast 151st Street., on the south by N.E. 135th Street on the east by Florida International University, and on the west by Biscayne Blvd.

Description
It is a registered Superfund site.

There are 4 areas: a  landfill,  of uplands,  of altered wetlands, and  adjacent to Biscayne Bay that are separated from the rest of the site by the State of Florida mangrove preserve

Environmental risks
Natural soils in the landfill area had been removed prior to dumping, increasing risk of pollution seepage, especially into the Biscayne Aquifer, a primary source for drinking water in South Florida. The solid waste was disposed of without the use of a liner and with no leachate control mechanisms, so rainfall percolating through the solid waste has caused the release of elevated levels of ammonia and other contaminants into the underlying groundwater and discharges into adjacent surface water.

The remainder of Munisport site beyond the landfill area unfortunately lies below the mean high water line, further increasing risk. Both inside and outside a dike constructed along the southeastern edge of the property are mangrove swamps. The flow of regional groundwater is southeastward, towards Biscayne Bay, but varies locally due to mounding.

Documented contamination
After heavy rains, contaminated water flows from the dump, flooding and contaminating the area.

When the EPA originally released their evaluation and report on the Munisport superfund site, it clearly stated that the land should never be developed and that an impermeable "cap" should be placed on the area so that toxic chemicals could not potentially leak into the air, water and soil, as the impact on human and aquatic health were unknown.

The original EPA evaluation of the site stated that the onsite samples originally tested contained di(2-ethylhexyl)phthalate, dieldrin, pentachlorophenol, and PCBs. Other samples contained lead, cadmium and ammonia. The ASTDR Public Health report stated:

The report stated that the dumping of 2,600 pounds of styrene in 1989, and 12,000 pounds in 198, occurred by just one boatyard. Governmental regulatory agencies at that time indicated that the extent of contaminants on the entire property remained unknown. The report indicated that it was necessary to go down more than two feet below ground (soil had only been tested superficially at one inch deep) to know what was really brewing beneath the surface. There is no evidence that this was ever done.

The Public Health Assessment concluded: "Inhalation of contaminated dust is a past and future air exposure pathway. Contaminated soils and fill material are sources of contaminated dust."

The Western portion of Munisport Dump was backfilled with solid waste consisting, among other things, of solid waste consisting of trash and municipal garbage. Among the non-permitted dumping discovered and documented were 12 drums containing tricresyl phosphate, ethylcyanoacetate, and acetate. "Small amounts" of hospital waste was found on the site.

The contamination in soil, sediments, surface water, and ground water sampled and documented include

4-DDE
ammonia
arsenic
asbestos
barium
benzene
beta-BHC
Bis(2-ethylhexyl) phthalate
cadmium
carbon disulfide
chlordane
chlorobenzene

chromium
coliform bacteria
dieldrin
ethylbenzene
leachate
lead
manganese
mercury
methylene chloride
molybdenum

nickel
pentachlorophenol
pesticides
polychlorinated biphenyls (PCBs)
strontium
styrene
vanadium
VOCs
zinc

Resident exposure to contamination
In the early 1990s Highland Park residents expressed concerns that contaminated soil and water at Munisport has exposed adjacent Highland Village mobile home park, population est. 1,500, by stormwater run-off and contaminated airborne pollution (by dust). In addition, Highland Park residents expressed concerns that children have been directly exposed when trespassing on the site. There was a 1990 landfill fire that residents believe could have caused additional toxic exposure, although air sampling was not done in time.

Documented complaints from adjacent Highland Village
The following are documented complaints from Highland Village Residents after dumping began at Munisport Landfill.
rashes, respiratory illnesses, and infections suffered in the 1970s and 1980s, caused by exposure to dust from landfill.
toxic smoke from the March/April 1990 landfill fire aggravated existing respiratory conditions
increased rates of eye irritation and infection from swimming at the Oleta State Recreation Area and in the lagoon adjacent to Florida International University.
children developed serious skin infections after being cut or scratched.
inordinately high number of cancers in their neighborhood after dumping began

See also
Landfill in the United States
List of Superfund sites in Florida

References

External links
 Engineering firm not legally responsible for pollution
 lawsuit
 condo tries to bury its past life as a dump
 Off the hazwaste hook - history of Munisport problems
 Center for Public Integrity - Munisport Landfill Information
 Unusual Cleanup Plan For Miami's Munisport Landfill Remains Controversial (Solid Waste Digest: Southern Edition, September, 1995)
EPA Superfund (CERCLIS) records for Munisport site

Former landfills in the United States
Geography of Miami-Dade County, Florida
North Miami, Florida
Superfund sites in Florida
1974 establishments in Florida